Berycopsis is an extinct genus of beardfish from the Cretaceous period. Fossils are known from England.

Like its modern relatives, the first fin rays in the dorsal and anal fins were modified into defensive spines, and the pelvic fins were located close to the pectoral fins. Berycopsis was one of the earliest fish known to have these features, which are widespread today.

References

Cretaceous bony fish
Polymixiiformes
Prehistoric ray-finned fish genera
Cretaceous fish of Europe